Chris Hubbard (born November 23, 1994) is a retired American soccer player.

Career

College and amateur
Hubbard played college soccer at the University of Notre Dame between 2013 and 2017. He served as backup goalkeeper during the 2013 and 2014 season, before securing the starting job in the latter three seasons.

In 2013, Hubbard also appeared for USL PDL side River City Rovers.

Professional
On January 8, 2018, Hubbard signed for United Soccer League side Louisville City.

Hubbard made his Louisville City debut on May 15, 2019, starting in a Lamar Hunt US Open Cup fixture against Reading United AC. He made his professional league debut one-month later in a 1-0 loss to New York Red Bulls II on June 16, 2019.

Following the 2021 season, Hubbard announced his retirement from playing professional soccer.

References

1994 births
Living people
American soccer players
Association football goalkeepers
Notre Dame Fighting Irish men's soccer players
Derby City Rovers players
Louisville City FC players
Soccer players from Louisville, Kentucky
USL League Two players
USL Championship players